Guy P. Brasseur (born 19 June 1948) is a Belgian meteorologist and climate scientist. His research interests include stratospheric ozone depletion, global air pollution, solar-terrestrial interactions and earth system research.

Career

Brasseur studied at the Vrije Universiteit Brussel and earned two engineering degrees, one in physics (1971) and another in telecommunications and electronics (1974). He then earned a PhD in physics at the same university. He worked at the Belgian Space Institute. In 1988 he joined the National Center for Atmospheric Research (NCAR) in Boulder, Colorado. In 2000 he became Director at the Max Planck Institute for Meteorology (MPI-M) and Scientific Director of the German Climate Computing Centre (DKRZ). From 2006 to 2009 he worked at NCAR. He founded the Climate Service Center Germany (HZG). Today he is head of the environmental modeling research group at the MPI-M and honorary professor at the University of Hamburg. He became a member of the Academia Europaea in 2000.

References

External links 

 Oral history interview transcript with Guy Brasseur on 25 June 2009, American Institute of Physics, Niels Bohr Library & Archives

Belgian climatologists
Academic staff of the University of Hamburg
Members of Academia Europaea
Belgian meteorologists
Vrije Universiteit Brussel alumni
1948 births

Living people
Max Planck Institute directors